Reggie Rivers (born February 22, 1968 in Dayton, Ohio) is a professional broadcaster and motivational speaker and former professional football player.

Sports career 

Rivers grew up in a U.S. Air Force family and lived in Ohio, England, Florida and Greece before his family moved to the San Antonio, Texas area. Rivers attended high school at Randolph High School in Randolph AFB, Texas, just outside of San Antonio. In his senior year he rushed for 1,200 yards and earned a scholarship to Southwest Texas State University (now called Texas State University).

Rivers was successful at Texas State, and was named to their "Hall of Honor" hall of fame in 2003. He majored in Journalism at Texas State and worked for the San Antonio Light.

From 1991 to 1996, Rivers played running back for the Denver Broncos of the National Football League. His most successful season was 1992, where he finished with 731 yards from scrimmage. It was also his most productive rushing year, with 282 yards on 74 carries. Rivers played in every Broncos game during that span, scoring 8 touchdowns. In 1993, Rivers was named the Denver Broncos' special teams Player of the Year.  While still a player, Rivers began working for KOA radio; he also wrote a sports column in the Rocky Mountain News.

After football 

After retiring from football, Rivers moved to broadcasting full-time, hosting his own talk show on KHOW from 1997-2002.  Rivers' KHOW show focused more on topical issues than sports, as did his Rocky Mountain News column during the same period (later, Rivers switched to The Denver Post). Since 2006, Rivers has served as KCNC-TV's weekend sports anchor. He currently lives in Denver, Colorado.

Works 

Rivers has also written five books:
The Vance: The Beginning & The End (1994) - an as-told-to autobiography of former Broncos wide receiver Vance Johnson.
Power Shift (2000) - a novel about a sports reporter and a player who hate each other.
4th & Fixed (2004) - a novel about a crime family fixing NFL games.
My Wife's Boyfriend and Our Feud with the Highlands Ranch Homeowners Association (2006)- a comedic novel about a marriage falling apart in the suburbs.
The Colony: A Political Tale (2009) - an allegory about foreign policy told through two colonies of ants.

External links

References

1968 births
Living people
American football running backs
Denver Broncos players
Texas State University alumni
College football announcers
Texas State Bobcats football players